WJMM-FM is a Christian radio station based in Lexington, Kentucky serving all of Central Kentucky.

External links
 Official site
 

JMM-FM